Edison T. Liu, M.D. is the former president and CEO of The Jackson Laboratory, and the former director of its NCI-designated Cancer Center (2012-2021). As CEO of The Jackson Laboratory, the organization doubled revenue, faculty and personnel, expanded globally from two campuses to six, established 13 endowed chairs, and increased the institutional endowment by five-fold. He is currently a Professor and Honorary Fellow at the institution. Before joining The Jackson Laboratory, he was the founding executive director of the Genome Institute of Singapore (GIS) (an A*STAR institute), chairman of the board of the Health Sciences Authority, and president of the Human Genome Organization (HUGO) (2007-2013). As the executive director of the GIS, he brought the institution to international prominence as one of the most productive genomics institutions in the world.

Between 1997 and 2001, he was the scientific director of the National Cancer Institute's Division of Clinical Sciences where he was in charge of the intramural clinical translational science programs. From 1987 to 1996, Dr. Liu was a faculty member at the University of North Carolina at Chapel Hill, where he was the director of the Lineberger Comprehensive Cancer Center's Specialized Program of Research Excellence in Breast Cancer; the director of the Laboratory of Molecular Epidemiology at UNC School of Public Health; chief of Medical Genetics; and the chair of the Correlative Science Committee of the national cooperative clinical trials group, CALGB.

Dr. Liu's scientific research has focused on the functional genomics of human cancers, particularly breast cancer (identifying the tandem duplicator phenotype genomic configuration), discovering new oncogenes (AXL family of receptor tyrosine kinases), and deciphering the dynamics of gene regulation on a genomic scale that modulates cancer biology. His work has spanned basic to population sciences to translation to the clinic. He has authored over 320 scientific papers and reviews, and co-authored two books.

In his spare time, Liu pursues jazz piano and composition, and writes for the lay public on science, medicine and society.

Education
1983-1987
Postdoctoral Fellow - Dept. of Microbiology, University of California at San Francisco, CA (Dr. J. Michael Bishop)

1982-1985
Hematology Fellowship, University of California San Francisco, Moffitt Hospital

1980-1982
Oncology Fellowship, Stanford University

1979-1980
Residency, Barnes Hospital - Washington University School of Medicine

1978-1979
Internship, Barnes Hospital - Washington University in St. Louis

1973-1978
Stanford University School of Medicine, M.D.

1969-1973
Stanford University, B.S. Chemistry, Psychology

Professional Appointments
2021–present
Professor, President Emeritus, and Honorary Fellow, The Jackson Laboratory

2011-2021
President and CEO, The Jackson Laboratory

2001-2011
Executive Director, Genome Institute of Singapore

2007–2011
Chairman, Governing Board Health Sciences Authority of Singapore

1996-2001
Director, Division of Clinical Sciences, National Cancer Institute, Bethesda, MD

1995-1996
Chief, Division of Medical Genetics, UNC School of Medicine

1995-1996
Professor, UNC Departments of Medicine, Epidemiology, Biochemistry and Biophysics.

1993-1995
Associate Professor, Departments of Medicine and Epidemiology and Biochemistry, University of North Carolina at Chapel Hill

1992-1996
Director, Specialized Program of Research Excellence in Breast Cancer (NIH-designated)

1987-1993
Assistant Professor in Medicine and Oncology, UNC School of Medicine

Honors and awards
2018
Honorary Degree recipient, University of Southern Maine

2016
Honorary Degree recipient, Colby College

2016
Elected Fellow, American Association for the Advancement of Science

2014
Chen Award for Distinguished Academic Achievement in Human Genetic and Genomic Research (from Human Genome Organization)

2010
Fellow, The Hastings Center

2008
Associate (Foreign) Member European Molecular Biology Organization (EMBO)

2007-2013
President, the Human Genome Organization (HUGO)

2007
Doctor of Medical Science honoris causa, awarded by Queen's University Belfast

2005
National Healthcare Group (NHG), Singapore, Distinguished Contributor Award

2003
Public Service Medal (National Day, 2003), for work in controlling SARS in Singapore (given by the Office of the President, Republic of Singapore)

2000
Rosenthal Award, AACR: for the discovery that HER-2 status determines response to adjuvant chemotherapy with doxorubicin

1999
Elected-Board of Directors, American Association for Cancer Research

1996
Brinker International Award for Breast Cancer Research - Basic Research Award

1995
American Society of Clinical Investigation (Membership)

1991-1996
Leukemia and Lymphoma Society Scholar

1985-1988
Clinical Investigator Award, National Cancer Institute, K08-CA01036-02, Preceptor: Dr. J. Michael Bishop.

1983-1985
Damon Runyan Cancer Fund Fellowship Preceptor: Dr. J. Michael Bishop (UCSF)

1973
Phi Beta Kappa

Committee and Advisory Board
2020–present
Board of Directors, American Cancer Society

2012–present
Board of Directors, Foundation for the National Institutes of Health

2018-2021
Board of Directors, American Association for Cancer Research (AACR)

2003-2007
Bioethics Advisory Committee, Singapore  (Advisory to the Cabinet of Singaporean Parliament)         

2002
Ministerial committee to re-evaluate Singapore's secondary school system (Ministry of Education)

2001
President's Life Sciences Committee (National University of Singapore)

2001-2003
Genetically Modified Organisms Advisory Council (Singapore Government)

2000-2001
NCI-Ireland-Northern Ireland Cancer Consortium Governing Board (Member)

1999-2000
Chair, General Motors Cancer Research Awards Committee: Mott Award

1997-2001
co-chair, NIH Clinical Center Advisory Council

1997
Chairman, NIH Committee on Extramural/Intramural Investigations in the Clinical Center

1997
Molecular Epidemiology Coordinating Group, NCI

1996
NCI - Developmental Diagnostics Working Group, 1996

References

1957 births
Living people
21st-century American chemists
Hastings Center Fellows
Stanford University alumni
Stanford University School of Medicine alumni
Washington University School of Medicine people